Phototoxic tar dermatitis results from coal tar, creosote, crude coal tar, or pitch, in conjunction with sunlight exposure, which induces a sunburn reaction associated with severe burning sensation.

See also 
 Skin lesion

References 

Skin conditions resulting from physical factors